Ekala, Sri Lanka is a suburb of Ja-Ela situated within a radius of 3 km from Ja-Ela. Ekala is notable as an industrial location. It belongs to the Ja-Ela Pradeshiya Sabha.

Industries
There are many factories in Ekala such as Rhino Industries, Eveready, Camoplast, Polytex Garments, etc..

Lakdiva Engineering Company
Lakdiva Engineering Company operates a service workshop for the Sri Lanka Transport Board(SLTB) buses in Ekala.

Air Force(TTS)
SLAF Ekala is the Sri Lanka Air Force station in Ekala. It is the primary training centre for all Sri Lanka Air Force specialist airmen trades, to this end the station is home to the Advanced & Specialized Trade Training School ( A & S TTS). It is also the home of the office of Chief Recruiting Officer, who is responsible for recruiting Officers and others ranks to the SLAF.

Transportation
To Colombo=The main Interprovincial bus route 5-Kurunegala-Colombo passes through this town. For short distances, the 265-Minuwangoda-Colombo or 187-1 or 187-2 Ekala/Nivasiepura-Fort buses are present.

To Gampaha= 201-Ja-Ela-Gampaha/Nittambuwa buses are present.

To Raddolugama= 267/1-Ja-Ela-Raddolugama buses are present.

References

Populated places in Gampaha District
Ja-Ela